Pinecastle Records is a record label based in Piedmont, South Carolina specializing in supporting and developing bluegrass music artists.

History
Tom Riggs started the Pinecastle Records in 1989 as an outlet for bluegrass pioneer Bill Harrell who wanted an outlet for his son Mitch to release a CD. The label was originally based in Orlando, Florida but moved to Columbus, North Carolina in 2005.

In 1993, Pinecastle purchased Virginia-based Webco Records. They reissued recordings of some Webco artists, such as Larry Stephenson and The Reno Brothers.

In 2002, Riggs received a Distinguished Achievement Award from the International Bluegrass Music Association.

Pinecastle folded in February 2010 due to Rigg's health issues. 

Lonnie Lassiter took ownership and reopened Pinecastle on August 1, 2010, naming Ethan Burkhardt as Vice President of Operations and Matt Hood as Vice President of Public Relations.

In 2012, Pinecastle signed with Syntax Creative.

In 2015, Pinecastle awarded a one-song contract  to each winner of MerleFest’s Chris Austin Songwriting Competition. The resulting compilation disc was promoted to radio and the public.

Artists
Here is a partial list of artists who have released recordings on the Pinecastle label. 
 Eddie & Martha Adcock
 David Aldridge & Brooke Justice
 Kristin Scott Benson
 Wayne Benson
 Beth Stevens & Edge
 Blue Mafia
 BlueRidge
 Dale Ann Bradley
 Jesse Brock
 Ray Cardwell
 Churchmen
 The Circuit Riders
 Continental Divide
 Charlie Cook
 Jack Cooke
 The Dillards
 The Dixie Bee-Liners
 Terry Eldredge
 Bill Emerson
 Flashback
 Grasstowne
 Eddie Hancock
 Bill Harrell
 Brad Hudson
 Jim Hurst & Missy Raines
 Jim & Jesse
 Sally Jones
 Lorraine Jordan & Carolina Road
 Phil Leadbetter
 Edgar Loudermilk
 The McLains
 Jesse McReynolds
 The New Coon Creek Girls
 Newton & Thomas
 New Vintage
 Michelle Nixon
 Nothin' Fancy
 Nu-Blu
 The Osborne Brothers
 David Parmley
 The Rarely Herd
 Redwing
 Reno Brothers
 Kim Robins
 Sister Sadie
 Karl Shiflett & Big Country Show
 Rickie Simpkins
 Special Consensus
 Larry Stephenson
 Mike Stevens
 Ernie Thacker
 Niall Toner
 Town Mountain
 Fred Travers with the Borderline Band
 Scott Vestal
 The Village Singers
 Matt Wallace
 Charlie Waller & The Country Gentlemen
 Marty Warburton
 White House
 Marshall Wilborn
 Josh Williams
 Wildfire
 Williamson Branch

See also 
 List of record labels

References

External links
 
 

American record labels
Bluegrass record labels
American independent record labels